The Bridge is the debut and only studio album by American punk-emo band Letter Kills. Produced by Jim Wirt, the album was released on July 2, 2004 through Island Records. It peaked at number 130 on the Billboard top 200 albums chart, but spawned no hit singles. Letter Kills disbanded while working on a follow-up record.

Track listing

Personnel

Letter Kills
Matthew James Shelton – lead vocals
Timothy Cordova – lead guitar, backing vocals
Dustin Lovelis – rhythm guitar, backing vocals
Kyle Duckworth – bass guitar, backing vocals
Paul Remund – drums, backing vocals

Artwork
Matthew Lindauer – art direction, design

Management
Paul Resta – marketing

Production
Jim Wirt – producer, engineer, mixing
Tara Podolsky & Paul Pontius – A&R
Pete Martinez – assistant engineer
Neil Couser – digital editing
CJ Eiriksson – digital editing, engineer, mixing
Andrew Huggins, Phil Kaffel, & P.J. Smith– engineers
Tom Lord-Alge – mixing
Stephen Marcussen – mastering

Charts

Notes
The track "Radio Up" was featured on the game Burnout 3: Takedown and in NHL 2005.

References

2004 albums
Island Records albums